Hungary competed at the 1994 Winter Olympics in Lillehammer, Norway.

Competitors
The following is the list of number of competitors in the Games.

Alpine skiing

Men

Women

Biathlon

Men

Women

Bobsleigh

Figure skating

Women

Ice Dancing

Speed skating

Men

References

Official Olympic Reports
International Olympic Committee results database

Nations at the 1994 Winter Olympics
Winter Olympics
1994